Mark Edmondson won the title, defeating Brad Drewett 7–5, 6–2 in the final.

Seeds

 n/a
  Colin Dibley (first round)
  Tim Gullikson (quarterfinals)
  Chris Lewis (second round)
  Mark Edmondson (champion)
  Eddie Edwards (semifinals)
  Syd Ball (semifinals)
  Geoff Masters (first round)

Draw

Finals

Top half

Bottom half

External links
 1981 South Australian Open draw

Singles